X11 is a system which implements the X display protocol.

X11 may also refer to:
 X-11-ARIMA, an older Statistics Canada/U.S. Census Bureau software package for seasonal adjustment
 X11 (New York City bus)
 X11, a variation of the SL X10 train
 X11, a hashing algorithm
 X11.app, the implementation of the X Window System in Mac OS X
 Honda X11
 N11 code, any of a set of public service telephone numbers in North America
 

X-11 may refer to:
 Chevy Citation X-11, a performance-enhanced version of the Chevy Citation
 Convair X-11, the first testbed for what became the Atlas missile program